Whitecliffs is a village located in the Selwyn District of the Canterbury region of New Zealand's South Island.  It has also been known as South Malvern (Sheffield was formerly known as Malvern), and the name of Whitecliffs comes from terrace cliffs above the Selwyn River / Waikirikiri.

Demographics
It is part of the Glentunnel statistical area. 

Malvern Hills-Whitecliffs had a population of 174 at the 2018 New Zealand census, an increase of 21 people (13.7%) since the 2013 census, and an increase of 45 people (34.9%) since the 2006 census. There were 81 households. There were 84 males and 90 females, giving a sex ratio of 0.93 males per female. The median age was 44.8 years (compared with 37.4 years nationally), with 33 people (19.0%) aged under 15 years, 21 (12.1%) aged 15 to 29, 93 (53.4%) aged 30 to 64, and 27 (15.5%) aged 65 or older.

Ethnicities were 94.8% European/Pākehā, 8.6% Māori, and 1.7% Pacific peoples (totals add to more than 100% since people could identify with multiple ethnicities).

Although some people objected to giving their religion, 58.6% had no religion and 27.6% were Christian.

Of those at least 15 years old, 30 (21.3%) people had a bachelor or higher degree, and 33 (23.4%) people had no formal qualifications. The median income was $34,700, compared with $31,800 nationally. The employment status of those at least 15 was that 72 (51.1%) people were employed full-time, 21 (14.9%) were part-time, and 6 (4.3%) were unemployed.

Industry 

The town was once significantly larger and home to industrial activity such as pottery and brick-making, and coal and sand mining took place nearby. No industry takes place anymore.

Transport 
The town's economic importance was significant enough for the Whitecliffs Branch, a branch line railway from the Midland Line, to be built to the town. It opened on 3 November 1875. Passenger services ceased on 13 March 1949, and due to declining freight, the line was closed entirely on 31 March 1962. The railway's engine shed still stands in the town.

References

External links
Information about Whitecliffs

Selwyn District
Populated places in Canterbury, New Zealand